Spectrum HoloByte, Inc. was a video game developer and publisher. The company, founded in 1983, was known for its simulation games, notably the Falcon series of combat flight simulators, and for publishing the first version of Tetris outside the Soviet Union (in 1988 for MS-DOS). Spectrum HoloByte published games for various home computers and video game consoles.

History
Spectrum HoloByte was founded in 1983 in Boulder, Colorado by Jeff Sauter, Phil Adam and Mike Franklin.

In 1987 Spectrum HoloByte merged with another game developer, Nexa Corporation, forming a common holding company, Sphere, Inc., and prompting the company's move from Colorado to California. Nexa founder Gilman Louie served as chairman of the combined company.

In 1992, Spectrum HoloByte received an investment from Kleiner Perkins, which let the company repurchase shares formerly owned by Robert Maxwell's companies, ending its ties to their bankruptcies. In December 1993, Sphere, Inc. merged with MicroProse to form MicroProse Inc. For the following years, games from both companies were published under their respective brands, but in 1996 all titles were consolidated under the MicroProse brand.

Hasbro Interactive acquired the merged company in 1998, and what had been Spectrum HoloByte ceased to exist when the development studio in Alameda, California, was closed in 1999.

Games

References

External links

MicroProse
Defunct video game companies of the United States
Video game companies established in 1983
Video game companies disestablished in 1999
Video game development companies